"Don't Keep Me Hangin' On" is a 1970 single by Sonny James. It was James's thirty-fourth release to reach the U.S. country singles chart, spending four weeks at number one and a total of fourteen weeks on the chart.

Chart performance

References

1970 singles
Sonny James songs
1970 songs
Song recordings produced by George Richey
Capitol Records singles
Songs written by Sonny James